Lara Maria Alexander (born 13 July 1967) is an Australian politician. She has been a Liberal member of the Tasmanian House of Assembly for Bass since 2022.

Alexander is an accountant and holds a Bachelor of Economic Studies (Honours). She was general manager of Presbyterian Care Tasmania and in 2018 became chief executive officer of the St Vincent de Paul Society in Tasmania. She was an unsuccessful Liberal candidate for Bass at the 2021 Tasmanian state election, and complained during the campaign of being prevented from speaking publicly by Liberal Party headquarters. In February 2022 she filled the vacancy caused by Sarah Courtney's resignation, winning a recount of votes.

References

1967 births
Living people
Members of the Tasmanian House of Assembly
Liberal Party of Australia members of the Parliament of Tasmania
21st-century Australian politicians
Women members of the Tasmanian House of Assembly
21st-century Australian women politicians